Sant'Agata Feltria is a comune (municipality) in the Province of Rimini in the Italian region Emilia-Romagna, located about  southeast of Bologna and about  south of Rimini.

Overview
It is home to a large fortress (Fortilizio), designed, among the others, by Francesco di Giorgio Martini

History 
After the referendum of 17 and 18 December 2006, Sant'Agata Feltria was detached from the Province of Pesaro and Urbino (Marche) to join Emilia-Romagna and the Province of Rimini on 15 August 2009.

References

External links
 Official website

Cities and towns in Emilia-Romagna